The Increased Penalties Act was a bill that increased the penalties for violating prohibition.  Enacted on March 2, 1929, it is also called the "Jones–Stalker Act" or the "Jones Act". The legislation was sponsored by two Republicans, Sen. Wesley L. Jones of Washington and Rep. Gale H. Stalker of upstate New York State. It stipulated that wherever any penalty was prescribed for the illegal manufacture, sale, transportation, importation, or exportation of intoxicating liquor as defined in the Volstead Act of 1919, the penalty imposed for each such offense should be a fine not to exceed $10,000 or imprisonment not to exceed five years, or both. The Act did not repeal any minimum penalties then prescribed by law. It further declared that it was the intent of Congress that the courts, in sentencing offenders, "should discriminate between casual or slight violations and habitual sales of intoxicating liquor, or attempts to commercialize violations of the law."

Its purpose, as explained by Sen. Jones, was to stiffen the penalties against those convicted of violating Prohibition for commercial purposes. In particular, the Act increased the penalties for importing, transporting, and exporting liquor, to match the existing penalties for manufacturing and selling it. All five of these activities were expressly forbidden by the 18th Amendment, but the Volstead Act did not penalize importation or transportation as heavily as manufacture or sale.

The bill passed the Senate on February 19, 1929, by a vote of 65 to 18. On February 28 the House passed it by a vote of 284 to 90 (also reported as 283 to 90). President Calvin Coolidge signed the legislation on March 2, 1929.

The Jones Law affects primarily the punishment provision of the Volstead Law, and might as a matter of technique have been made an amendment thereof. Its legal consequences are very considerable, since it materially changes the substantive nature of liquor law violations, and the procedural problems of those charged with punishment thereof. Its influence will even be felt in the state courts. Finally, it vests in the judges of the federal courts a wide and very important discretion.

The Jones Law does not alone increase maximum penalties, it makes an important change in the classification. A judge sentencing a violator of the Volstead Act is now faced with the following admonition:

Notes

Prohibition in the United States
70th United States Congress
United States federal criminal legislation
1929 in American law